Aconitum noveboracense, also known as northern blue monkshood or northern wild monkshood, is a flowering plant belonging to the buttercup family (Ranunculaceae).  Members of its genus (Aconitum) are also known as wolfsbane.

The United States Fish and Wildlife Service government lists it as a threatened species. It grows in rare portions of New York State and in portions of the Driftless Area.

Northern monkshood is noted for its very distinctive, blue hood-shaped flowers. The flowers are about 1 inch in length, and a single stem may have many flowers. Stems range from about 1 to 4 feet in length. The leaves are broad with coarse, toothed lobes.

 Only found in Iowa, Wisconsin, Ohio, and New York.
 Typically found on shaded to partially shaded cliffs, algific talus slopes, or on cool, streamside sites. These areas have cool soil conditions, cold air drainage, or cold groundwater flowage. On algific talus slopes, these conditions are caused by the outflow of cool air and water from ice contained in underground fissures. These fissures are connected to sinkholes and are a conduit for the air flows.

Northern monkshood is a perennial and reproduces from both seed and small tubers. The flowers bloom between June and September and are pollinated when bumblebees pry open the blossom to collect nectar and pollen.

Causes of threatened status 

 Habitat loss or degradation - Threats to northern monkshood include contamination and filling of sinkholes, grazing and trampling by livestock, human foot traffic, logging, maintenance of highways and power lines, misapplication of pesticides, quarrying, and road building.
 Collection - Some populations have been adversely affected by scientific collection.
 This plant is very rare it is currently only found in 4 states.

Protection 

 Listing - Northern monkshood was added to the U.S. List of Endangered and Threatened Wildlife and Plants in 1978.
 Recovery plan - The U.S. Fish and Wildlife Service has developed a recovery plan that describes actions needed to help the plant survive.
 Research - Many northern monkshood populations are being monitored to determine long-term population trends. Genetic studies are being conducted so population differences can be better understood.
 Habitat protection - A variety of government and private conservation agencies are all working to preserve the northern monkshood and its habitat. Voluntary protection agreements have also been made with some private landowners.

Images

References 

  

noveboracense
Flora of Iowa
Flora of Ohio
Flora of New York (state)
Flora of Wisconsin
Driftless Area
Plants described in 1886